Spijkenisse Centrum is one of three above-ground subway stations in the Dutch city of Spijkenisse. The station is served by trains of Rotterdam Metro lines C and D and has two side platforms. Located just outside the station is a hospital, as well as a bus station allowing interchange with local and regional buses. In 1986 the station received the National Steel Award in category A: Buildings with a steel support structure.

The station was opened on 25 April 1985. On that date, the North-South Line (currently operated by line D trains) was extended from its former terminus, Zalmplaat station, towards its current terminus, De Akkers station. Since the East-West Line was connected to the North-South Line in November 2002, trains of what is currently line C also call at the station.

Rotterdam Metro stations
Nissewaard
Railway stations opened in 1985
1985 establishments in the Netherlands
Railway stations in the Netherlands opened in the 20th century